Redux  is the generic name of a family of phenol–formaldehyde/polyvinyl–formal adhesives developed by Aero Research Limited (ARL) at Duxford, UK, in the 1940s, subsequently produced by Ciba (ARL). The brand name is now also used for a range of epoxy and bismaleimide adhesives manufactured by Hexcel. The name is a contraction of REsearch at DUXford.

History
Devised at ARL by Dr. Norman de Bruyne and George Newell in 1941 for use in the aircraft industry, the adhesive is used for the bonding of metal-to-metal and metal-to-wood structures. The adhesive system comprises a liquid phenolic resin and a PVF (PolyVinylFormal) thermoplastic powder.

The first formulation available was Redux Liquid E/Formvar, comprising a phenolic liquid (Redux Liquid E) and a PVF powder (Formvar), and after its initial non-aviation related application of bonding clutch plates on Churchill and Cromwell tanks, it was used by de Havilland from 1943 to the early 1960s, on, among other aircraft, the Hornet, the Comet and the derived Nimrod, and the Dove, Heron and Trident. It was also used by Vickers on the Viking and by Chance Vought on the F7U Cutlass.

Typically, Redux would be used to affix stiffening stringers and doublers to wing and fuselage panels, the resulting panel being both stronger and lighter than a riveted structure. In the case of the Hornet it was used to join the aluminium lower-wing skin to the wooden upper wing structure, and in the fabrication of the aluminium/wood main wing spar, both forms of composite construction made possible by the advent of Redux.

After initially supplying de Havilland only, ARL subsequently produced a refined form of Redux Liquid E/Formvar using a new liquid component known as Redux Liquid K6, and a finer-grade (smaller particle-size) PVF powder, and this was later made generally available to the wider aircraft industry as Redux Liquid 775/Powder 775, so-named because it was sold for aircraft use to specification DTD 775*. Available for general non-aerospace use it was called Redux Liquid K6/Powder C.

Redux Liquid 775/Powder 775 was joined in 1954 by the subsequent Redux Film 775 system, used from 1962 by de Havilland (later Hawker Siddeley and subsequently British Aerospace) on the DH.125 and DH.146. Other users included Bristol (on the Britannia), SAAB (on the Lansen & Draken), Fokker (on the F.27), Sud Aviation (on the Alouette II/III), Breguet and Fairchild, the film-form having the advantage of greater gap-filling ability with no loss of strength over Redux Liquid 775/Powder 775, allowing for wider tolerances in component-fit, as well as easier handling and use and controlled ratios of the liquid/powder components.   
Other Redux adhesives available included "Redux 64", a solution of the phenolic liquid and PVF powder, used worldwide for bonding linings to brake shoes, pads and clutches.
The Redux range was subsequently expanded to include the current range of adhesives, both in single and two part paste systems and film forms, for both aerospace and industrial uses.

* DTD = Directorate of Technical Development

Usage

To use Redux in its liquid/powder form, a thin film of the phenolic liquid is applied to both mating surfaces and then dusted with or dipped in the PVF powder to give an approximate ratio by weight of 1 part liquid to 2 parts powder. The coated joints are then allowed to stand for between 30 minutes and 72 hours, then the components are brought together under elevated pressure and temperature. This is not critical and variations in curing-time and/or temperature may be used to increase shear and creep strength at temperatures above .

Performance (typical) Redux 775

Lap shear strength at ambient temperature = 
Young's Modulus (E) = 
Shear modulus =  

Strength of bonds to materials other than aluminium:

Tensile shear of   lap joints at room temperature:

Bright mild steel of thickness  - mean failing stress = 
Stainless steel of thickness  - mean failing stress = 
Magnesium alloy1 of thickness  - mean failing stress = 
Commercially-pure titanium2 of thickness  - mean failing stress = 

1 = HK31A-H24

2 = ICI Titanium 130

See also
Araldite
 Aerolite
 Tego film

References

Project 3 – Environmental Durability of Adhesive Bonds – Report No. 9 – Forensic Studies of Adhesive Joints – Part 2 Bonded Aircraft Structure by A. Beevers. September 1995. 
Usage on the de Havilland Comet
The de Bruyne Medal
Bonding with Redux.(reprinted from The Aeroplane – Sept 1946)
Hexcel Redux film adhesive – 50th anniversary Press Release
Hexcel Redux 775 Product Data

External links
A 1957 Aero Research advert for Redux
"Joint Economics" a  short article on Redux by N. A de Bruyne in a 1953 issue of Flight

Adhesives
Materials science
Aerospace engineering